During the 2004–05 English football season, Queens Park Rangers F.C. competed in the inaugural season of the Football League Championship, having been promoted from the old Second Division (now renamed League One) the previous season.

Season summary
After a slow start to the season, QPR won seven games in a row to rise up to third in the Championship table, though the good form didn't last and the West London side eventually finished in a comfortable midtable position - 12 points from the relegation zone and 11 points off the play-off places.

QPR were eliminated from the League Cup in the second round by Premiership side Aston Villa and the FA Cup in the third round by fellow Championship side Nottingham Forest.

Final league table

Results
Queens Park Rangers' score comes first

Legend

Football League Championship

FA Cup

League Cup

Players

First-team squad

Left club during season

Reserve squad

Statistics

References

Notes

Queens Park Rangers F.C. seasons
Queens Park Rangers